James L. Shuck (born August 23, 1954) is a former American football coach. He was the 25th head football coach at the Virginia Military Institute (VMI) in Lexington, Virginia, serving for five seasons, from 1989 to 1993, and compiling a record of 14–40–1.

Head coaching record

References

1954 births
Living people
American football offensive guards
Army Black Knights football coaches
Indiana Hoosiers football coaches
Indiana Hoosiers football players
VMI Keydets football coaches